Richard Gadze (born 23 August 1994) is a Ghanaian professional footballer who plays as a striker.

Career

Club
Gadze played for several Ghanaian teams, including Ebusua Dwarfs, before signing for Indian Super League club Delhi Dynamos in September 2015. Gadze scored his first goal for Delhi Dynamos in their 2–1 victory over Pune City on 14 October 2015.

HJK
On 25 January 2016, Gadze signed for Veikkausliiga side Helsingin Jalkapalloklubi on loan, returning to Delhi Dynamos on 7 September 2016.

Zira
On 1 February 2017, Zira FK of the Azerbaijan Premier League announced the signing of Gadze on a half year contract. Zira announced on 30 May 2017, that Gadze had signed a new one-year contract, with the option of an additional year. Zira declined to take up the option of the second year of Gadze's contract, with him leaving Zira at the end of the 2017/18 season.

Zira return
In October 2019, Gadze returned to Zira FK on a one-year contract.

Sheriff Tiraspol
On 7 August 2020, Gadze signed a contract with Sheriff Tiraspol.

Sumgayit
On 27 October 2022, Gadze signed for Azerbaijan Premier League club Sumgayit on a contract until the end of the 2023–24 season. He scored against "Neftchi" in the first game.

International
On 30 August 2013, Gadze made his international debut in the 0–1 loss to Libya. In November 2013, coach Maxwell Konadu, invited him to be a part of the Ghana squad for the 2013 WAFU Nations Cup. He helped the team to a first-place finish after Ghana beat Senegal by three goals to one.

Career statistics

Club

References

1993 births
Living people
Ghanaian footballers
Association football forwards
WAFU Nations Cup players
Ebusua Dwarfs players
Odisha FC players
Helsingin Jalkapalloklubi players
Zira FK players
FC Voluntari players
FC Sheriff Tiraspol players
Bnei Sakhnin F.C. players
Ghana Premier League players
Indian Super League players
Veikkausliiga players
Azerbaijan Premier League players
Liga I players
Moldovan Super Liga players
Israeli Premier League players
Ghanaian expatriate footballers
Expatriate footballers in India
Expatriate footballers in Finland
Expatriate footballers in Azerbaijan
Expatriate footballers in Romania
Expatriate footballers in Moldova
Expatriate footballers in Israel
Ghanaian expatriate sportspeople in India
Ghanaian expatriate sportspeople in Finland
Ghanaian expatriate sportspeople in Azerbaijan
Ghanaian expatriate sportspeople in Romania
Ghanaian expatriate sportspeople in Moldova
Ghanaian expatriate sportspeople in Israel
Sumgayit FK players